Karoline Charlotte Dyhre Breivang (born 10 May 1980) is a retired Norwegian handball player. She is a double Olympic gold medalist, a world champion and five time European champion. Breivang played for the Norwegian club Larvik HK until her retirement at the end of the 2016–2017 season. She previously played for Hosle IL and Stabæk Håndball. She made her debut on the national team in 2000; she played 305 matches (a Norwegian record) and scored 475 goals.

References

1980 births
Living people
Sportspeople from Bærum
Norwegian female handball players
Handball players at the 2008 Summer Olympics
Olympic handball players of Norway
Olympic gold medalists for Norway
Olympic medalists in handball
Handball players at the 2012 Summer Olympics
Medalists at the 2012 Summer Olympics
Medalists at the 2008 Summer Olympics